Dale Stephens may refer to:

Dale Stephens (footballer) (born 1989), English footballer for Burnley
Dale Stephens (politician) (born 1959), American state legislator in West Virginia
Dale J. Stephens, American writer